Diplacus bigelovii is a species of monkeyflower known by the common name Bigelow's monkeyflower. It is native to the southwestern United States, where it grows in desert and slope habitats. It was formerly known as Mimulus bigelovii.

Description
Diplacus bigelovi is a hairy annual herb producing an erect stem 2 to 25 centimeters tall. The plant is variable in size and shape as well as color, the herbage being green to nearly red in color. The pointed oval or rounded leaves are each up to 3.5 centimeters long and arranged in opposite pairs about the stem.

The tubular base of the flower is surrounded by a reddish-green or purple ribbed calyx of hairy sepals with long lobe tips. The trumpet-shaped flower corolla is roughly one to two centimeters long and has a very narrow tube and a wide mouth. The corolla has two upper lobes and three lower, and is generally magenta or deep pink in color with darker red, purple, and yellow spots in the throat.

References

External links
Jepson Manual Treatment - Mimulus bigelovi
USDA Plants Profile: Mimulus bigelovi
Mimulus bigelovi - Photo gallery

bigelovii
Flora of the Southwestern United States
Flora of the California desert regions
Flora of the Sonoran Deserts
Flora of the Great Basin
Natural history of the Colorado Desert
Natural history of the Mojave Desert
Plants described in 1871
Flora without expected TNC conservation status